The 2021–22 Lincoln City F.C. season is the club's 138th season in their history and their third consecutive season in EFL League One. Along with League One, the club will also participate in the FA Cup, EFL Cup and EFL Trophy.

The season covers the period from 1 July 2021 to 30 June 2022.

Season overview

May
On 28 May, they announced their home shirt for the 2021–22 season, confirming that the shirt would feature five sponsors across the season.

June
On 17 June, during the off-season, Harvey Jabara became a nine percent shareholder in Lincoln City Holdings, investing an initial “high six-figure” sum into the Imps. As part of the development, former USA international Landon Donovan joined the Imps as a Strategic Advisor, working with the Board, to enhance the Clubs network and relationships, particularly within North America.

Also on 17 June, they announced their first of five shirt sponsors for the season, Virgin Wines.

On 25 June, it was confirmed that Ian Reeve would step down as a director and board member after six-years with the club.

Also on 25 June, it was confirmed that Craig Housley has joined the club as Head Groundsman.

July
On 6 July, Lincoln City announced their new group of First-Year Scholars, who include; Sam Green, Nathan Kabeya, Darryl Powell, Osei Boffah, Oisin Gallagher, Harry Dale, Theo Mussell, Kyrell Wheatley and Tayo Alexander-Tucker.

On 13 July, manager Michael Appleton announced that he would be taking a few weeks off following routine surgery, after he was diagnosed with testicular cancer a few weeks earlier.

On 30 July, the club announced their new away shirt for the 2021–22 season, with it being sponsored by SRP Hire Solutions.

August
On 3 August, the club announced a new brand partnership with EQVVS for the upcoming season.

On 4 August, the club announced their squad number for the 2021–22 season.

On 5 August, it was announced that Imps chief executive Liam Scully, had been appointed chair of the EFL Trust, officially taking up the role in September 2021.

On 25 August, the game against Rotherham United had to be rearranged due to international call ups.

On 26 August, Elicha Ahui joined the first-year scholars program.

September
On 17 September, ex-player Jack Hobbs would return to his first club on an assistant coaching role working with the academy's Shadow Scholarship programme.

On 18 September, it was confirmed that Virgin Wines would no longer be the shirt sponsor after the Ipswich Town game.

On 29 September, Light Source became the second of five home shirt sponsors for the season.

On 30 September, the game against Wigan Athletic was postponed due to international call ups.

October
On 1 October, the club launched their third kit for the season.

November
On 1 November, the game against Sunderland was postponed due to international call ups.

On 23 November, Buildbase became the third of five home shirt sponsors across the season.

December
On 14 December, it was confirmed that Chris Travers had returned to the clubs board.

On 16 December, their upcoming game against Doncaster Rovers was postponed due to an outbreak of COVID-19 at the visitors.

On 28 December, their upcoming game against Rotherham United was postponed due to an outbreak of COVID-19 inside the Imps squad.

On 30 December, their upcoming game against Ipswich Town was postponed due to the continuing outbreak of COVID-19 inside the Imps squad.

January
On 18 January, their rearranged game against Rotherham United was postponed due to a frozen pitch.

On 26 January, University of Lincoln became the fourth of five home shirt sponsors for the season.

On 27 January, the club published their annual accounts for the year ending June 2021.

February
On 19 January, the game against Fleetwood Town was cancelled due to snow on the pitch.

March
On 1 March, Richard Clarke stepped down as a director of the club.

On 15 March, Brooke Norton-Cuffy red card against AFC Wimbledon was successfully appealed and was available to play in their upcoming games.

On 17 March, Branston Ltd became the final of five home shirt sponsors for the season.

April
On 30 April, following their victory over Crewe Alexandra, it was announced that manager Michael Appleton would be leaving his role as manager.

May
On 5 May, Ross Burbeary was appointed as head of performance.

On 6 May, Shamrock Rovers manager Stephen Bradley announced he turned down an approach to be the next Lincoln City manager.

On 12 May, Mark Kennedy was appointed as the new head coach.

Pre-season
On 18 June, Lincoln announced their pre-season schedule, confirming two games against Norwich City and Gainsborough Trinity and on 21 June 2021, Lincoln confirmed the remaining fixtures against, Reading, Nottingham Forest XI, Boston United, Scunthorpe United and Salford City. An additional friendly against Stockport County was announced on 27 July 2021.

Competitions

League One

League table

Results summary

Results by matchday

Matches
On Thursday, 24 June 2021, the EFL League One fixtures were revealed.

FA Cup

Lincoln were drawn at home to Bowers & Pitsea in the first round. They were drawn against either Hartlepool United or Wycombe Wanderers in the second round, drawn on the 8 November 2021.

EFL Cup

The first round draw was made on 24 June, live on Sky Sports, by Andy Cole and Danny Mills.

EFL Trophy

The Imps were drawn into Group F of the Northern section alongside Bradford City, Sunderland and Manchester United U21. Two of the three group stage fixture dates were later confirmed on July 22. The opening group stage fixture was confirmed on August 17. They were drawn against Carlisle United in the second round drawn.

Transfers & contracts

Transfers in

Transfers out

Loans in

Loans out

New contracts

Squad statistics

Appearances 

|-
|colspan="12" style="text-align:center;" |Away on loan

|-
|colspan="12" style="text-align:center;" |No longer at the club

|}

Goalscorers

Includes all competitive matches.

Disciplinary record

Clean sheets

Awards

Club Player of the Season

Club Academy Player of the Season

Sky Bet League One Player of the Month

Sky Bet League One Manager of the Month

References 

2021–22 EFL League One by team
Lincoln City F.C. seasons